Steven Robert Sykes (born 5 August 1984 in Middelburg, Eastern Cape, South Africa) is a South African rugby union player, currently playing for  in the French Top14. His regular position is lock.

Career

Youth

While still at school, Sykes represented Eastern Province at various youth tournaments. He played for them at primary school level at the 1997 Under-13 Craven Week competition and progressed through the youth sides to the Under-18 Craven Week team in 2002.

Sharks / Sharks

In 2003, Sykes moved to Durban to join the  academy. He was also selected in the South African Under-19 side that played at the Under 19 Rugby World Championship in 2003 and also represented the Sharks Under-20 side in the Under-20 Provincial Competition in 2003 and 2004.

The Sharks topped their section to qualify for the Premier Division.

He remained involved in both the Vodacom Cup and Currie Cup side in 2006, making a total of 22 appearances and contributing one try in their match against .

In 2007, Sykes became involved in the Super Rugby side for the first time. However, Johan Ackermann returned for the remainder of the competition and Sykes made five starts for the Wildebeest in the 2007 Vodacom Cup.

He started off 2008 playing Vodacom Cup rugby and made three starts before being recalled to the squad for the 2008 Super 14 season. He remained a key player for them in the Currie Cup, making thirteen appearances during the 2008 Currie Cup Premier Division, helping the Sharks reach the final of the competition for the first time in 5 years.

The Super 14 season was followed by the 2009 British & Irish Lions tour to South Africa, with Sykes involved on three occasions. Firstly, he played for the Sharks against the British & Irish Lions in their fourth tour match. He also featured in a match between the Lions and an Emerging Springboks side, playing the first hour of a 13–13 draw in Cape Town. He was then called into the Springbok team for the third test, but he remained an unused substitute as the Lions ran out 28–9 winners.

Sykes made a further thirteen appearances for the Sharks in the 2010 Super 14 season and sixteen appearances in the 2010 Currie Cup Premier Division, as they recaptured the title, beating  30–10 in the final in Durban.

Leinster

After seven-and-a-half years in Durban, Sykes signed a three-year contract with Irish Pro12 and Heineken Cup side Leinster. However, he made just four appearances for the Dublin-based side before returning to South Africa.

Return to Sharks

He once returned to the Sharks, signing for them on a one-year contract.

Eastern Province Kings / Southern Kings (2013–14)

The EP Kings were promoted to the Premier Division of the Currie Cup for 2014 following a decision by SARU to increase the division from six teams to eight. Sykes was one of a number of players rested for the duration of the 2014 Vodacom Cup in an attempt to get them to optimum conditioning for their Currie Cup campaign. Sykes made six starts in the competition before a knee injury ruled him out of the final stages of the competition.

Cheetahs

Eastern Province Kings / Southern Kings (2015–)

He returned to the Eastern Province Kings for their 2015 Currie Cup Premier Division campaign. He helped his side improve on their 2014 record, winning two matches and finishing the season in seventh position.

As a result of the Eastern Province Kings' financial situation, all of their players were free to cancel their contracts and join other teams. However, Sykes was one of the first batch of twenty players that signed a contract to play Super Rugby in 2016 for a  team whose operations were taken over by the South African Rugby Union.

Oyonnax

During the 2016 Super Rugby season, French side  announced that Sykes would join them for the 2016–17 season.

Honours

Sharks

 Currie Cup winner: 2008, 2010

Sharks
 Super 14 runner-up: 2007

References

1984 births
Living people
People from Middelburg, Eastern Cape
South African rugby union players
Sharks (rugby union) players
Sharks (Currie Cup) players
Eastern Province Elephants players
Southern Kings players
Leinster Rugby players
Rugby union locks
White South African people
South African people of British descent
Rugby union players from the Eastern Cape